The Österman Brothers' Virago (Swedish: Bröderna Östermans huskors) is a 1945 Swedish comedy film directed by Ivar Johansson and starring Emy Hagman, Adolf Jahr and Artur Rolén. The title is also translated as The Österman Brothers' Shrew or The Österman Brothers' Battle-Axe. It was based on the 1913 play of the same title by Oscar Wennersten, which has been adapted for film several times. It was followed by a sequel The Wedding on Solö in 1946.

Synopsis
The three lazy Österman brothers own a farm, and decide that they need help with the housework. When the maid Anna arrives she proves to be efficient and domineering and soon takes over the running of the place. This leads the brothers to consider her a Battle-axe and virago and plot about ways to get her to leave.

Cast
 Emy Hagman as 	Anna Söderberg
 Adolf Jahr as Kalle Oesterman
 Artur Rolén as 	Lasse Oesterman
 John Elfström as 	Nisse Österman
 Julia Cæsar as 	Helena Vestman
 Arthur Fischer as Janne Vestman
 Siegfried Fischer as 	Vestman
 Agda Helin as 	Mrs. Storckenbrandt
 Eric Gustafson as Elof Storckenbrandt
 Nils Kihlberg as 	Axel Olsson
 Aurore Palmgren as 	Stina Olsson
 Solveig Wedin as 	Ella Vestman
 John Botvid as 	Accountant
 Bertil Ehrenmark as 	Captain 
 Gösta Ericsson as 	Anders 
 David Erikson as Grandell 
 Hartwig Fock as 	Coachman 
 Anna-Lisa Fröberg as Passenger 
 Carl Hagman as 	Cashier 
 Carl Harald as 	Policeman 
 Stig Johanson as 	Helmsman
 Greta Liming as 	Girl at office
 Birger Åsander as 	Anna's boyfriend

References

Bibliography 
 Qvist, Per Olov & von Bagh, Peter. Guide to the Cinema of Sweden and Finland. Greenwood Publishing Group, 2000.

External links 
 

1945 films
Swedish comedy films
1945 comedy films
1940s Swedish-language films
Films directed by Ivar Johansson
Swedish black-and-white films
Swedish films based on plays
Remakes of Swedish films
1940s Swedish films